The area currently occupied by the U.S. State of Colorado has undergone numerous changes in occupancy, territorial claims, and political designations. Paleoamericans entered the region about 11,500 BCE, although new research indicates the region may have been visited much earlier. At least nine Native American nations have called the area home. Although Europeans may have entered the region as early as 1540, the first European fort was not constructed until 1819, and the first European town was not established until 1851, primarily due to the opposition of the Ute people. Spain, France, Mexico, and the Republic of Texas have all claimed areas of future state. The United States first claimed an eastern portion of the future state with the Louisiana Purchase of 1803. The United States surrendered the portion of the region south and west of the Arkansas River to the Spanish Empire with the Adams–Onís Treaty in 1821. The United States completed its acquisition of the region with the Treaty of Guadalupe Hidalgo that ended the Mexican–American War in 1848. The United States created the free Territory of Colorado in 1861 following the Pikes Peak Gold Rush. The Territory fought for the Union during the American Civil War despite many of its founders being natives of slave states or territories. The Territory of Colorado joined the Union as the State of Colorado in 1876, the centennial year of the United States.


Indigenous peoples
Indigenous peoples who have lived in the area of the present State of Colorado:

Paleoamericans
Pre-Clovis culture
Clovis culture
Folsom culture
Plano cultures
Archaic Period
Apex complex
Archaic–Early Basketmaker Era
Mount Albion complex
Post-Archaic Period
Apishapa culture
Dismal River culture
Panhandle culture
Sopris phase
Plains-Woodland
Ancestral Puebloans
Mesa Verde
Native American Nations
Apache Nation
Jicarilla Apache
Arapaho Nation
Northern Arapaho
Southern Arapaho
Cheyenne Nation
Comanche Nation
Kiowa Nation
Navajo Nation
Pawnee Nation
Shoshone Nation
Eastern Shoshone
Ute Nation
Capote Ute band — native to the upper Rio Grande valley and the San Luis Valley.
Mouache Ute band — native to the eastern slope of the Southern Rocky Mountains, from Denver south into New Mexico.
Parianuche Ute band, later known as the Grand River or White River band — native to the upper Colorado River valley.
Tabeguache Ute band, later known as the Uncompahgre band — native to the Gunnison River and Uncompahgre River valleys.
Weeminuche Ute band — native to the San Juan River basin in Colorado and New Mexico.
Yamparica Ute band, later known as the White River band — native to northwestern Colorado.
Uintah Ute bands including the bands named Cumumba, Pahvant, San Pitch, Sheberetch, Tumpanawach, and Uinta-ats — native to eastern Utah.

Early European claims
Early Iberian claims in the New World:

Christopher Columbus (Cristòffa Cómbo) leads his first voyage from August 3, 1492, to March 15, 1493.
Columbus led the first southern European expedition to the Americas. Columbus substantially underestimated the circumference of the Earth and mistook the Lucayan Archipelago and the Greater Antilles for the southern islands of the Japanese Archipelago. Nevertheless, this expedition became the basis for the Spanish claim to all of the Americas.
Pope Alexander VI issues his papal bull Inter Caetera on May 4, 1493.
After receiving accounts of the first voyage of Columbus, Valencian Pope Alexander VI issued this papal bull that split the non-Christian world into two halves for Christian exploration, conquest, conversion, and exploitation. The eastern half went to the King of Portugal and the western half (including almost all of the Americas) went to the Queen of Castile and the King of Aragon.
The Treaty of Tordesillas is signed on June 7, 1494.
This treaty signed by the Portuguese Empire and the Spanish Empire established a new demarcation meridian farther west than the meridian established by the papal bull Inter Caetera. This gave Portugal a much greater portion of Brazil but kept the rest of the Americas under Spanish purview. Pope Julius II sanctioned the treaty with his papal bull Ea quae pro bono pacis issued on January 24, 1506.
Vasco Núñez de Balboa claims the Mar del Sur (Pacific Ocean) and all adjacent lands for the Queen of Castile on September 29, 1513.
The members of the Balboa expedition became the first Europeans to reach the eastern Pacific Ocean. The Balboa claim included all of the Americas west of the Continental Divide.

Spanish Empire 1492-1821
Territorial claims of the Spanish Empire in the area of the present State of Colorado:

Columbus claims San Salvador for the Catholic Monarchs of Spain on October 12, 1492.
 Spanish Empire, 1492-1821
Columbus landed on the Taíno island of Guanahani in the Bahamas which he renamed San Salvador and claimed for Queen Isabel I of Castile and the King Fernando II of Aragon. This claim became the founding basis for the Spanish Empire.

Hernán Cortés defeats Cuauhtémoc and seizes Tenochtitlán on August 13, 1521.
 Viceroyalty of New Spain, 1521-1821
Upon his conquest of the Aztec Empire, Cortés renamed Tenochtitlán as México and proclaimed the establishment of Nueva España (New Spain).
Francisco Vázquez de Coronado leads an expedition north from Compostela on February 23, 1540.
Coronado led an extensive expedition north from New Spain in search of the mythical Seven Cities of Gold. The expedition explored the future U.S. states of Arizona, New Mexico, Texas, Oklahoma, Kansas, and possibly Colorado.

Juan de Oñate establishes the Spanish colony of Santa Fe de Nuevo Méjico on July 12, 1598.
 Santa Fé de Nuevo Méjico, 1598–1821
Oñate established the colony of Santa Fe de Nuevo Méjico at the village of San Juan de los Caballeros adjacent to the Ohkay Owingeh Pueblo at the confluence of the río Bravo (Rio Grande) and the río Chama. At its greatest extent, the colony encompassed all of the present U.S. state of New Mexico and portions of Arizona, Utah, Colorado, Wyoming, Nebraska, Kansas, Oklahoma, Texas, and the Mexican state of Chihuahua.
The Adams–Onís Treaty is signed on February 22, 1819, and takes effect on February 22, 1821.
On February 22, 1819, the United States and the Spanish Empire signed the Treaty of Amity, Settlement, and Limits Between the United States of America and His Catholic Majesty. This treaty took effect two years later on February 22, 1821. The Spanish Empire ceded Florida, land east of the Sabine River, and claims north of the 41st parallel north to the United States. The United States ceded a southwestern portion of the Mississippi River basin to the Spanish Empire.
The Treaty of Córdoba is signed on August 24, 1821.
 Santa Fe de Nuevo México 1821–1848
With this treaty signed at Córdoba on August 24, 1821, the Spanish Empire acknowledged the independence of the Mexican Empire.

Kingdom of France 1682-1764
Territorial claim of the Kingdom of France to the Mississippi River basin:

La Salle claims La Louisiane for King Louis XIV of France on April 9, 1682.
 La Louisiane, 1682–1762
Having descended the Mississippi River to its mouth, La Salle claimed the entire Mississippi River basin for the King of France on April 9, 1682. This claim ignored Native Americans living in the region. The Spanish Empire disputed the southwestern extent of this claim as encroaching upon its province of Santa Fe de Nuevo México and later Texas. This dispute became moot with the signing of the Treaty of Fontainebleau on November 23, 1762, but arose again with the signing of the Third Treaty of San Ildefonso on October 1, 1800. With the Louisiana Purchase of 1803, the question of the southwestern extent of Louisiana became a dispute between the United States and the Spanish Empire.
The Treaty of Fontainebleau is signed on November 23, 1762, but not announced until September 30, 1764.
 La Luisiana, 1762-1801
Fearing the loss of all his North American territories as a result of the Seven Years' War (the French and Indian War in North America), King Louis XV of France made this secret pact transferring La Louisiane to his cousin King Carlos III of Spain. Despite the transfer to Spain, the region remained largely Francophone.

Kingdom of Spain 1762-1803
Territorial claims of the Kingdom of Spain in the Mississippi River basin:

The Treaty of Fontainebleau is signed on November 23, 1762, but not announced until September 30, 1764.
 La Luisiana, 1762-1801
King Louis XV of France transferred La Louisiane to King Carlos III of Spain with this secret pact.
The Third Treaty of San Ildefonso is signed on October 1, 1800.
Seeking to restore French presence in the Americas, French First Consul Napoléon Bonaparte pressured King Carlos IV of Spain to agree to this secret pact to transfer La Luisiana to the French Republic in exchange for French claims in Tuscany.
The Treaty of Aranjuez is signed on March 21, 1801.
 La Louisiane, 1801–1803
This treaty between the French Republic and the Spanish Empire set the terms for the "restoration of La Louisiane to France."
The Spanish Empire transfers control of La Luisiana to the French Republic on November 30, 1803.
In a ceremony at Nueva Orleans (New Orleans) on November 30, 1803, Spanish Governor Juan Manuel de Salcedo transferred control of La Luisiana to French Governor Pierre Clement de Laussat. This formal transfer of power was made solely to accommodate the Louisiana Purchase. On March 9, 1804, a similar ceremony was held at San Luis (St. Louis).

French Republic 1800-1803
Territorial claims of the French Republic in the Mississippi River basin:

The Third Treaty of San Ildefonso is signed on October 1, 1800.
Seeking to restore French presence in the Americas, French First Consul Napoléon Bonaparte pressured King Carlos IV of Spain to agree to this secret pact to transfer La Luisiana to the French Republic in exchange for French claims in Tuscany.
The Treaty of Aranjuez is signed on March 21, 1801.
 La Louisiane, 1801–1803
This treaty between the French Republic and the Spanish Empire set the terms for the "restoration of La Louisiane to France."
The Louisiana Purchase is signed on April 30, 1803, announced on July 4, 1803, ratified on October 20, 1803, and transferred on December 20, 1803.
 Louisiana Purchase, 1803
Wishing to guarantee American navigation rights on the Mississippi River, U.S. President Thomas Jefferson offered to purchase the Mississippi River port of New Orleans from the French Republic. Concerned with the potential cost of future campaigns, French First Consul Napoléon Bonaparte countered with an offer to sell the entire territory of La Louisiane to the United States. Agreeing to a price of 80 million French francs or $15 million U.S. dollars, A Treaty between the United States of America and the French Republic was signed on April 30, 1803.
The Spanish Empire transfers control of La Luisiana to the French Republic on November 30, 1803.
In a ceremony at Nueva Orleans (New Orleans) on November 30, 1803, Spanish Governor Juan Manuel de Salcedo transferred control of La Luisiana to French Governor Pierre Clement de Laussat. This formal transfer of power was made solely to accommodate the Louisiana Purchase. On March 9, 1804, a similar ceremony was held at San Luis (St. Louis).
The French Republic transfers control of La Louisiane to the United States on December 20, 1803.
On December 20, 1803, in a ceremony at La Nouvelle-Orléans (New Orleans) only 20 days after the transfer of Spanish control, French Governor Pierre Clement de Laussat transferred control of La Luisiana to U.S. Governor William Claiborne. On March 10, 1804, a similar ceremony was held at Saint-Louis (St. Louis).

Mexico 1821-1848
Territorial claims of Mexico south and west of the Adams–Onís border:

The Treaty of Córdoba is signed on August 24, 1821.
 Mexican Empire 1821–1823
With this treaty signed at Córdoba on August 24, 1821, the Spanish Empire acknowledged the independence of the Mexican Empire.
 Mexico 1823–1824
 Mexican Republic 1824–1835
The Treaty of Limits is signed on January 12, 1828, extended on April 5, 1831, and takes effect on April 5, 1832.
On January 12, 1828, the United States and the United Mexican States signed the Treaty of Limits between the United States of America and the United Mexican States. On April 5, 1831, the signatories extended the ratification period with an Additional Article to the Treaty of Limits concluded between the United States of America and the United Mexican States, on the 12th day of January, 1828. This treaty took effect one year later on April 5, 1832, and affirmed the border established between the United States and the Spanish Empire by the Adams–Onís Treaty.
 Mexican Republic 1835–1846
The Republic of Texas declares its independence from the Mexican Republic on March 2, 1836.
In 1829, the Mexican Republic banned slavery. Many Texians,  Anglo-American immigrants in the Mexican state of Coahuila y Tejas, owned slaves. Seven years later on March 2, 1836, the Texians declared their independence as the Republic of Texas. The Mexican Republic refused to recognize the Republic of Texas, although the United States recognized the Republic in 1837.
The United States annexes the Republic of Texas as the State of Texas on December 29, 1845.
On December 29, 1845, U.S. President James K. Polk signed the Joint resolution for the admission of the State of Texas into the Union. The United States assumed the territorial claims of the Republic of Texas upon the annexation. The Mexican Republic asserted that the annexation was a violation of the Treaty of Limits. This dispute led to the Mexican–American War.
The United States declares war on the Mexican Republic on May 13, 1846.
On May 13, 1846, U.S. President James K. Polk signed An act providing for the prosecution of the existing war between the United States and the Republic of Mexico. The Mexican–American War persisted until 1848.
The United States Army of the West seizes Santa Fe on August 15, 1846.
The 1,700 man Army of the West under the command of General Stephen Kearny seized the Nuevo México capital of Santa Fe with little resistance. General Kearny declared himself military governor of New Mexico on August 18, 1846, and established a civilian provisional government of New Mexico.
 United Mexican States 1846–1863
The Treaty of Guadalupe Hidalgo is signed on February 2, 1848, and takes effect on May 30, 1848.
 Mexican Cession, 1848–1850
On February 2, 1848, the United States and the United Mexican States signed the Treaty of Peace, Friendship, Limits, and Settlement between the United States of America and the United Mexican States at Guadalupe Hidalgo. This treaty took effect on May 30, 1848, ending the Mexican–American War. Mexico ceded its extensive northern territory to the United States.

Republic of Texas 1836-1845
Territorial claim of the Republic of Texas between the Rio Grande and the Adams–Onís border:

The Republic of Texas declares its independence from the Mexican Republic on March 2, 1836.
 Republic of Texas disputed with the Mexican Republic, 1836–1845
On March 2, 1836, Texians, Anglo-American immigrants in the Mexican state of Coahuila y Tejas, declared their independence as the Republic of Texas. The Mexican Republic refused to recognize the Republic of Texas, although the United States recognized the Republic in 1837. The Republic of Texas claimed as its eastern and northern border the Adams–Onís border with the United States and as its western and southern border the Rio Grande to its headwaters, thence north along meridian 107°32′35″ west to the Adams–Onís border with the United States.
The United States annexes the Republic of Texas as the State of Texas on December 29, 1845.
 State of Texas disputed with the Mexican Republic, 1845–1848
On December 29, 1845, U.S. President James K. Polk signed the Joint resolution for the admission of the State of Texas into the Union. The United States assumed the territorial claims of the Republic of Texas upon the annexation. The Mexican Republic asserted that the annexation was a violation of the Treaty of Limits. This dispute led to the Mexican–American War.

United States 1803 to present
Historical political divisions of the United States in the area of the present State of Colorado:

The Louisiana Purchase is signed on April 30, 1803, announced on July 4, 1803, ratified on October 20, 1803, and transferred on December 20, 1803.
 Louisiana Purchase, 1803
Wishing to guarantee American navigation rights on the Mississippi River, U.S. President Thomas Jefferson offered to purchase the Mississippi River port of New Orleans from the French Republic. Concerned with the potential cost of future campaigns, French First Consul Napoléon Bonaparte countered with an offer to sell the entire territory of La Louisiane to the United States. Agreeing to a price of 80 million French francs or $15 million U.S. dollars, A Treaty between the United States of America and the French Republic was signed on April 30, 1803. The United States Senate ratified the treaty on October 20, 1803. On October 21, 1803, President Jefferson signed An Act to enable the President of the United States to take possession Oct. 31, 1803, of the territories ceded by France to the United States, by the treaty concluded at Paris, on the thirtieth of April last; and for the temporary government thereof.

The French Republic transfers control of La Louisiane to the United States on December 20, 1803.
 Unorganized territory created by the Louisiana Purchase, 1803–1804
On December 20, 1803, in a ceremony at La Nouvelle-Orléans (New Orleans) only 20 days after the transfer of Spanish control, French Governor Pierre Clement de Laussat transferred control of La Luisiana to U.S. Governor William Claiborne. On March 10, 1804, a similar ceremony was held at Saint-Louis (St. Louis). The Louisiana Purchase remained unorganized and under military control until it was divided on October 1, 1804, into the Territory of Orleans south of the 33rd parallel north and the District of Louisiana north of the 33rd parallel north.
The Territory of Orleans and the District of Louisiana are created on October 1, 1804.
 District of Louisiana, 1804–1805
On March 26, 1804, U.S. President Thomas Jefferson signed An Act erecting Louisiana into two territories, and providing for the temporary government thereof. The Act created the District of Louisiana on October 1, 1804 from the portion of the Louisiana Purchase north of the 33rd parallel north. The District remained under the jurisdiction of the Indiana Territory until it was reorganized as the Territory of Louisiana on July 4, 1805.
The Territory of Louisiana is created on July 4, 1805.
 Territory of Louisiana, 1805–1812
On March 3, 1805, U.S. President Thomas Jefferson signed An Act further providing for the government of the district of Louisiana. The Act reorganized the District of Louisiana as the Territory of Louisiana on July 4, 1805. The Territory was reorganized as the Territory of Missouri on June 4, 1812.

The Territory of Missouri is created on June 4, 1812.
 Territory of Missouri, 1812–1821
On June 4, 1812, U.S. President James Madison signed An Act providing for the government of the territory of Missouri. The Act reorganized the Territory of Louisiana as the Territory of Missouri. On January 30, 1819, the northern border of the Territory with Rupert's Land was altered by the Anglo-American Convention of 1818. On March 2, 1819, the United States created the Territory of Arkansaw from the southern portion of the Territory. On February 22, 1821, the Adams–Onís Treaty reduced the southwestern extent of the Territory. The Territory existed until the admission of the State of Missouri into the Union on August 10, 1821.
The Adams–Onís Treaty is signed on February 22, 1819, and takes effect on February 22, 1821.
On February 22, 1819, the United States and the restored Kingdom of Spain signed the Treaty of Amity, Settlement, and Limits Between the United States of America and His Catholic Majesty. This treaty took effect two years later on February 22, 1821. The Spanish Empire ceded Florida, land east of the Sabine River, and claims north of the 41st parallel north to the United States. The United States ceded a southwestern portion of the Mississippi River basin to the Spanish Empire.

The Missouri Compromise is signed on March 6, 1820.
On March 6, 1820, U.S. President James Monroe signed An Act to authorize the people of the Missouri territory to form a constitution and state government, and for the admission of such state into the Union on an equal footing with the original states, and to prohibit slavery in certain territories. The Missouri Compromise allowed Missouri to become a slave state, but prohibited slavery in the western territories north of the parallel 36°30′ north.
The Missouri Statehood Proclamation issued on August 10, 1821.
 Unorganized territory previously the northwestern portion of the Missouri Territory, 1821–1854
On August 10, 1821, U.S. President James Monroe certified that the conditions for statehood had been fulfilled and issued Proclamation 28 — Admitting Missouri into the Union. The remaining northwestern portion of the Territory of Missouri became unorganized territory.
The Treaty of Limits is signed on January 12, 1828, extended on April 5, 1831, and takes effect on April 5, 1832.
On January 12, 1828, the United States and the United Mexican States signed the Treaty of Limits between the United States of America and the United Mexican States. On April 5, 1831, the signatories extended the ratification period with an Additional Article to the Treaty of Limits concluded between the United States of America and the United Mexican States, on the 12th day of January, 1828. This treaty took effect one year later on April 5, 1832, and affirmed the border established between the United States and the Spanish Empire by the Adams–Onís Treaty.

The United States annexes the Republic of Texas as the State of Texas on December 29, 1845.
On December 29, 1845, U.S. President James K. Polk signed the Joint resolution for the admission of the State of Texas into the Union. The United States assumed the territorial claims of the Republic of Texas upon the annexation. The Mexican Republic asserted that the annexation was a violation of the Treaty of Limits. This dispute led to the Mexican–American War.
The United States declares war on the Mexican Republic on May 13, 1846.
On May 13, 1846, U.S. President James K. Polk signed An act providing for the prosecution of the existing war between the United States and the Republic of Mexico. The Mexican–American War persisted until 1848.

The United States Army of the West seizes Santa Fe on August 15, 1846.
The 1,700 man Army of the West under the command of Brigadier General Stephen Kearny seized the Nuevo México capital of Santa Fe with little resistance. General Kearny assumed command as the first U.S. military governor of New Mexico. On September 22, General Kearny appointed Charles Bent as the first U.S. civilian governor of New Mexico.
The Treaty of Guadalupe Hidalgo is signed on February 2, 1848, and takes effect on May 30, 1848.
On February 2, 1848, the United States and the United Mexican States signed the Treaty of Peace, Friendship, Limits, and Settlement between the United States of America and the United Mexican States at Guadalupe Hidalgo. This treaty took effect on May 30, 1848, ending the Mexican–American War. Mexico ceded its extensive northern territory to the United States.
 Unorganized territory created by the Treaty of Guadalupe Hidalgo, 1848–1850
On May 30, 1848, the northern portion of the United Mexican States ceded to the United States becomes unorganized territory.

The Provisional State of Deseret is formed on March 10, 1849.
 Provisional State of Deseret, 1849–1851
On March 10, 1849, the Mormon settlers of the Great Salt Lake Valley formed the Provisional Government of the State of Deseret. Brigham Young was elected Governor. Deseret encompassed almost all of the present U.S. states of Utah and Nevada, and portions of Oregon, Idaho, Wyoming, Colorado, New Mexico, Arizona, and California, although only the Wasatch Front was occupied. The United States created the Territory of Utah on September 9, 1850. Deseret served as the de facto government of the Great Salt Lake Valley until the Provisional State was dissolved on April 4, 1851.
The Compromise of 1850 is approved on September 9, 1850.
 Territory of New Mexico, 1850–1912
 Territory of Utah, 1850–1896
On September 9, 1850, U.S. President Millard Fillmore signed three bills: An Act proposing to the State of Texas the Establishment of her Northern and Western Boundaries, the Relinquishment by the said State of all Territory claimed by her exterior to said Boundaries, and of all her Claims upon the United States, and to establish a territorial Government for New Mexico, An Act for the admission of the State of California into the Union, and An Act to establish a Territorial Government for Utah. The Territory of Utah existed until January 4, 1896, when  it was admitted into the Union as the State of Utah. Utah statehood was delayed over the issue of polygamy in the Territory. The Territory of New Mexico existed until January 6, 1912, when it was admitted into the Union as the State of New Mexico. New Mexico statehood was delayed due to the Spanish origins of the Territory.

The Kansas–Nebraska Act is signed on May 30, 1854.
 Territory of Kansas, 1854–1861
 Territory of Nebraska, 1854–1867
On May 30, 1854, U.S. President Franklin Pierce signed An Act to Organize the Territories of Nebraska and Kansas. This act superseded the Missouri Compromise and provided for the voters of the territories to decide for themselves whether to permit slavery. The Kansas–Nebraska Act unwittingly led to the American Civil War. The Territory of Kansas existed until January 29, 1861, when it was admitted into the Union as the free State of Kansas. The Territory of Nebraska existed until March 1, 1867, when it was admitted into the Union as the State of Nebraska.

The Provisional Territory of Jefferson is formed on October 24, 1859.
 Provisional Territory of Jefferson, 1859–1861
On October 24, 1859, the settlers in the Pike's Peak region formed the Provisional Government of the Territory of Jefferson and elected Robert Williamson Steele Governor. The Jefferson Territory extended from the 102nd meridian west to the 110th meridian west and from the 37th parallel north to the 43rd parallel north, and encompassed all of the present U.S. state of Colorado and portions of Utah, Wyoming, Nebraska, and Kansas. The United States created the Territory of Colorado on February 28, 1861. The Jefferson Territory served as the de facto government of the region until Governor Steele proclaimed the government disbanded on June 6, 1861.
The Kansas Statehood Act is signed on January 29, 1861.
 Unorganized territory previously the western portion of the Kansas Territory, 1861
On January 29, 1861, U.S. President James Buchanan signed An Act for the Admission of Kansas into the Union as a free state. The remaining western portion of the Territory of Kansas became unorganized territory. This area was incorporated into the Territory of Colorado 30 days later on February 28, 1861.

The Colorado Organic Act is signed on February 28, 1861.

 Territory of Colorado, 1861–1876
On February 28, 1861, U.S. President James Buchanan signed An Act to provide a temporary Government for the Territory of Colorado as a free territory. The Territory of Colorado replaced the Provisional Territory of Jefferson and comprised the unorganized territory previously the western portion of the Territory of Kansas and portions of the Territory of New Mexico, the Territory of Utah, and the Territory of Nebraska. The Colorado Territory existed until it was admitted into the Union as the State of Colorado on August 1, 1876.
The Colorado Enabling Act is signed on March 3, 1875.
On March 3, 1875, U.S. President Ulysses S. Grant signed An Act to enable the people of Colorado to form a constitution and State government, and for the admission of the said State into the Union on an equal footing with the original States.
The Colorado Statehood Proclamation issued on August 1, 1876.
 State of Colorado, since 1876
On August 1, 1876, U.S. President Ulysses S. Grant certified that the conditions of the Colorado Enabling Act had been fulfilled and issued Proclamation 230 — Admission of Colorado into the Union.

Maps

See also

Prehistory of Colorado
History of Colorado
Timeline of Colorado history
Indigenous peoples of the North American Southwest
Territorial evolution of the United States

Notes

References

External links

State of Colorado website
History Colorado website

Colorado geography-related lists
Colorado history-related lists
Geography of Colorado
History of Colorado
Colorado, Territorial evolution of
Colorado, Territorial evolution of
Colorado, Territorial evolution of